The women's liberation movement was a political movement born in the 1960s from Second-Wave Feminism.

Women's Liberation or Women's Lib may also refer to:

Feminist movement
Women's LibeRATion, an incarnation of the Rat newspaper
Women's Lib (The Goodies), an episode of The Goodies